The 2016 NASCAR Sprint All-Star Race (XXXII) was a NASCAR Sprint Cup Series stock car exhibition race held on May 21, 2016 at Charlotte Motor Speedway in Concord, North Carolina. Contested over 113 laps, it was the second exhibition race of the 2016 Sprint Cup Series season.

This marks the first all-star race without Jeff Gordon since 1993.

Report

Background

The All-Star Race was open to race winners from last season through the 2016 AAA 400 Drive for Autism at Dover International Speedway and all previous All-Star race winners and Sprint Cup champions who had attempted to qualify for every race in 2016 were eligible to compete in the All-Star Race.

Entry list

Sprint Showdown
The entry list for the Sprint Showdown was released on Monday, May 16 at 12:29 p.m. Eastern time. Twenty-five drivers were entered for the race.

Sprint All-Star Race
The entry list for the All-Star Race was released that same day at 11:34 a.m. Fifteen cars were automatically entered for the race. Five other cars transferred from the Sprint Showdown to determine the final grid for the Sprint All-Star Race.  Kyle Busch's car was renumbered to No. 75 to celebrate the said anniversary of sponsor Mars Corporation's M&M's brand candy.

Practice

Sprint Showdown practice
Sprint Showdown practice was originally scheduled to be held on Friday, May 20. However, the practice session was canceled because of wet track conditions caused by constant rain showers.

All-Star Race practice

Sprint Showdown

Segment One
Chase Elliott led the field to the green flag at 11:32 a.m. The first caution of the race flew on lap 16 for a single-car spin on the frontstretch. Exiting turn 4, Michael McDowell got loose and spun through the grass.

The race restarted on lap 20. Coming to the line, Trevor Bayne edged out Elliott to win the first segment. Brian Scott was tagged for a lug nut violation and Cole Whitt was tagged for his crew being over the wall too soon. Both restarted the race from the tail-end of the field.

Segment Two
The race restarted on lap 21. Austin Dillon passed Elliott going into turn 1 to take the lead on lap 22. Greg Biffle passed Dillon going into turn 3 to take the lead with 24 laps to go and drove onto win the segment.

Segment Three
The race restarted with 10 laps to go. Kyle Larson battled Elliott to the line to win the segment. Elliott was voted into the All-Star Race by fan vote.  Because of a quick caused by an eligible driver not being entered, second place in fan vote Danica Patrick was also voted into the All-Star Race.

Sprint Showdown results

All-Star Race starting lineup

All-Star Race

Segment 1
Under North Carolina night skies, Kevin Harvick led the field to the green flag at 10:11 p.m. Kyle Busch led the first lap, but he and Harvick raced side-by-side for the lead for a number of laps before Harvick took it on lap 6. Harvick made his mandatory stop of the race on lap 27 and surrendered the lead to Busch. Logano passed Busch to take the lead on lap 34. He pitted with five laps to go in the first segment as Jamie McMurray spinning brought out the first caution of the race. Matt Kenseth hadn't pitted under green as the rules require, so he was held a lap under caution as the segment ended. Brad Keselowski exited pit road with the race lead.

Segment 2
The race restarted on lap 51. Weepers in turn 2 brought out the second caution of the race on lap 57.

The race restarted on lap 62 and a multi-car wreck on the frontstretch brought out the third caution of the race. Exiting turn 4, Kenseth got turned up the track, collected Tony Stewart and slammed the wall. Stewart's car turned down the track and collected Kasey Kahne. Stewart said afterwards that he was "as baffled as anybody. I don’t know how we were scored a lap down after they stopped the 20 car, and they pit everyone together. Lap down and lead lap and lap down. It’s the most screwed up All-Star race I’ve ever been a part of. I’m glad this is the last one.” He would go on to finish last.

The race restarted on lap 72.

13 laps to go
The race restarted with 13 laps to go. Logano dove underneath Kyle Larson going into turn 1 and Larson ended up in the wall with three laps to go. Larson said afterwards that he "was able to clear them and I thought I would pull away pretty easily because I was really good on short runs. Joey and their team must have done a really good job at making the right adjustments. We made the car a little bit better, but I guess we really didn't take a big enough swing to tighten up." Logano drove on to score the victory.

Post-race

Driver comments
Logano said after the race that his race was "awesome. I thought it went great. What a great car. It says a lot about our race team to unload today with a completely new package, have 10 minutes of practice and unload and say, ‘The car is pretty good. I don’t have much to say. We really made only one change on our car. That was about the only amount of time we had in practice was to make one change. It was the same for everybody, but, overall, I felt like our car was competitive.”

All-Star Race results

Media

Television
Fox Sports was the television broadcaster of the race in the United States. Lap-by-lap announcer, Mike Joy, was accompanied on the broadcast by retired NASCAR drivers, Jeff Gordon and Darrell Waltrip. Jamie Little, Vince Welch, and Matt Yocum reported from pit lane.

Radio
Motor Racing Network (MRN) continued their longstanding relationship with the track to broadcast the race on radio. The lead announcers for the race's broadcast were Joe Moore, Jeff Striegle and Rusty Wallace. The network also implemented two announcers on each side of the track: Dave Moody in turns 1 and 2 and Kyle Rickey in turns 3 and 4. Alex Hayden, Winston Kelly and Steve Post were the network's pit lane reporters. The network's broadcast was also simulcasted on Sirius XM NASCAR Radio.

References

Sprint All-Star Race
Sprint All-Star Race
NASCAR races at Charlotte Motor Speedway
NASCAR Sprint All-Star Race
NASCAR All-Star Race